Pileh Savar (also Romanized as Pīleh Savār; also known as Razvaliny Pilesevar) is a village in Zangebar Rural District, in the Central District of Poldasht County, West Azerbaijan Province, Iran. At the 2006 census, its population was 402, in 90 families.

References 

Populated places in Poldasht County